The Deutsches Rechtswörterbuch (DRW) or Dictionary of Historical German Legal Terms is a historic legal dictionary developed under the aegis of the Heidelberg Academy of Sciences and Humanities. The research unit took up work in 1897 and until today has completed 93,155 articles, ranging from Aachenfahrt (pilgrimage to Aachen) to selbzwölft (being one of twelve persons). These have been published in 12 consecutive volumes and are also freely accessible online. In course of its research, the DRW also touches upon sources in Old English, of Hanseatic provenance and Pennsylvania German. The research unit will presumably conclude its work in 2036.

Objectives 
The DRW aims at covering German legal terminology from the Middle Ages up to the beginning of the 19th century. In this context, legal language is understood as a general historical vocabulary in reference to legal meanings. The research unit wants to outline how legal concepts, convictions and institutions manifested themselves in everyday language. Concomitantly, the DRW does not only contain legal terms, but common phrases bearing relation to legal contexts. Furthermore, the DRW as part of its research lists the legally relevant vocabulary, not only of Modern High German, but of all Western German language varieties. The dictionary cites usage of historical vocabulary from various regions of the West Germanic language area from England to Transylvania, from Lorraine to the Baltic Seas. In order to capture the full lexical diversity of meanings for each word, the dictionary employs techniques of synchronic and diachronic comparative law in addition to purely linguistic and lexicographic approaches, against the backdrop of historical contextualisation.

As Germany’s Federal President Richard von Weizsäcker once wrote:

“The Rechtswörterbuch incorporates language- and culture-historical references beyond purely legal understandings, thus making the work truly cross-disciplinary.”

History 

The DRW was initiated in 1896/97 as a project of the Royal Prussian Academy of Science at about the same time as other fundamental dictionary projects like the Schweizerisches Idiotikon. Perhaps, the envisioned Dictionary on Anglo-Norman Legal Terms by the Selden Society served as an inspiration (the renamed Dictionary of Law French compiled by Elsie Shanks sadly has never been published). Leading German capacities in the field of legal history, history and language history like Heinrich Brunner, Ernst Dümmler and Karl Weinhold belonged to the founding commission. Otto von Gierke was also a founding member and being rooted in the tradition of the German Historical School pledged for the inclusion of the West Germanic languages. Since the first head of research unit, Prof. Dr. iur. Richard Schröder, held office in Heidelberg, the DRW has been located from the start in the historic city on the river Neckar. Schröder’s successor was Prof. Eberhard Freiherr von Künßberg. Since he was married to a Jewish woman, the family had to emigrate to the United States (see descendants Ekkehard von Kuenssberg and Laura Kuenssberg). These circumstances contributed to the inner and outer turmoil the research unit faced in the wake of Nazi rule and World War II. Arising from the division of Germany and the dissolution of the Prussian academy (hence called German Academy of Sciences at Berlin), the DRW was incorporated into the Heidelberg academy in 1959. Forty years later, the late head of research unit Dr. Heino Speer, initialised the free of charge Internet publication.

Modus operandi and sources 
Every article deals with a certain word, which has been lemmatised into a standard German form. It contains linguistic information, explanations regarding the word’s acceptation(s) and the specific legal context. All meanings and compounds are illustrated by means of historical evidence cited in original language and excerpted from the DRW’s selection of sources. As main sources the DRW used various titles, from which more than two million quotations have been extracted in the research units’ early years. The excerpts were written on paper slides and are retrieved from the paper slide archive to the present day, as the basis of the research work. Owing to clarity, the DRW provides the used titles with scribal abbreviations. The catalogue of these so called Siglen amount to over 8000 titles in total and consist of:

      over 4300 Monographs

      over 1900 multipart items and series

      over 900 journals

      over 1000 non-independent works

The sources used date back from 500 AD to 1835 AD and cover the following languages:

      vernacular words from early Latin texts (500–800)

      Old English (600–1100)

      Old High German (600–1050)

      Lombardic (650–1000)

      Old Dutch (700–1200)

      Old Saxon (800–1200)

      Old Frisian (800–1500)

      Middle High German (1050–1350)

      Middle Dutch (1200–1500/1600)

      Middle Low German (1200–1650)

      Early Modern High German (1350–1650)

      Modern High German (1650–1835)

The dictionary's oldest evidence dates back to 479 AD and was excerpted from a Merovingian Charter at the time of Clovis I. The word at issue is "mundburt" (meaning a lord's special protection rights) for which Felix Liebermann's Die Gesetze der Angelsachsen ("mundbyrd", 685/86) provides evidence. Old English texts thus amount to a major part of the oldest sources cited in the DRW.

The DRW has made arrangements, which have to be met, in order for compounds and simplexes to be featured in the articles. Compounds should not exceed the turn of the 18th century. In order for a simplex to be included in the dictionary, the word's first verifiable evidence must date from 1815, at the latest. Terms originating from the designated timeframe of 1815 to 1835 will not be printed, but published with short reference in the online version.

English sources 
In particular, Liebermann’s aforementioned Die Gesetze der Angelsachsen (The Anglo-Saxons‘ Law) serve as an important source for the DRW with regard to Old English. Die Gesetze der Angelsachsen contains the laws proclaimed by Anglo-Saxon rulers over the course of 5 centuries and remains “authoritative” and “unsurpassed” in the field. When it comes to Old English, cross references are at times given to the seminal Anglo-Saxon Dictionary by Bosworth and Toller.

In addition, many legal documents concerning the Hanseatic League and their Stahlhof (Steelyard) in London might bear special interest for the English user.

Following migration to North America in the 17th and 18th century, German settlers from the Rhine Franconian language region preserved their dialects nowadays known as Pennsylvania German languages. Pennsylvania German words, thus also find their way into the DRW, e.g. freiheitsbâm > Freiheitsbaum (tree of freedom) according to Lambert’s Dictionary of the non-English words of the Pennsylvania-German dialect meaning black poplar.

References 

German online version of the DRW

English version of the DRW’s official website

Further reading 
 (en) Academies of Science and Humanities – Stores of Knowledge for the Future, 2012 (download here).
 (en) Andreas Deutsch, The „Dictionary of Historical German Legal Terms” and its European concept, in: Charlotte Brewer (ed.), The Fifth International Conference on Historical Lexicography and Lexicology (ICHLL5), Oxford University Research Archive (ORA), http://ora.ox.ac.uk/objects/uuid:ef5d07d3-77fc-4f07-b13f-d4c24b4d1848, 2011.
 (en) Philip Durkin, The Oxford Handbook of Lexicography, Oxford 2015, p. 172. 
 (en) Rufus Gouws (ed.), Dictionaries. An International Encyclopedia of Lexicography, in: Handbücher zur Sprach- und Kommunikationswissenschaft, Bd. 5, Berlin / Boston 2014, p. 732f. 
 (en) Günther Grewendorf (ed.), Formal Linguistics and Law, in: Trends in Linguistics. Studies and Monographs, Vol. 212, Berlin [u.a.] 2009, p. 14. 
 (en) Marlies Janson & Helmut Opitz (ed.), World Guide to Special Liberaries Vol. 1, Berlin / Boston 2007, p. 379 and 613.
 (de) Günther Dickel, Heino Speer: Deutsches Rechtswörterbuch: Konzeption und lexikographische Praxis während acht Jahrzehnten (1897–1977). In: Helmut Henne (Hrsg.): Praxis der Lexikographie. Berichte aus der Werkstatt. (= Reihe germanistische Linguistik. Bd. 22). Niemeyer, Tübingen 1979, S. 20–37.
 (de) Christina Kimmel: Auge, Mund, Nase und Ohr im Recht. Ausgewählte Beispiele aus dem Corpus des Deutschen Rechtswörterbuchs. In: Forschungen zur Rechtsarchäologie und Rechtlichen Volkskunde. Bd. 17, 1997, 800035-9, S. 101–114
 (de) Ulrich Kronauer: Das Deutsche Rechtswörterbuch – ein zu wenig bekanntes Hilfsmittel der 18.-Jahrhundert-Forschung. In: Das achtzehnte Jahrhundert. Mitteilungen der Deutschen Gesellschaft für die Erforschung des Achtzehnten Jahrhunderts. Bd. 14, Heft 2, 1990,, S. 281–283.
 (de) Ulrich Kronauer: Gefühle im Rechtsleben. Aus der Werkstatt des Deutschen Rechtswörterbuchs. In: Merkur. Nr. 597 = Bd. 52, Heft 12, 1998, S. 1181–1186.
 (de) Ulrich Kronauer: Bilder vom „Zigeuner“ in rechtssprachlichen Quellen und ihre Darstellung im Deutschen Rechtswörterbuch. In: Anita Awosusi (Hrsg.): Stichwort: Zigeuner. Zur Stigmatisierung von Sinti und Roma in Lexika und Enzyklopädien (= Schriftenreihe des Dokumentations- und Kulturzentrums Deutscher Sinti und Roma. Bd. 8). Verlag Das Wunderhorn, Heidelberg 1998, S. 97–118.
 (de) Ulrich Kronauer, Jörn Garber (Hrsg.): Recht und Sprache in der deutschen Aufklärung (= Hallesche Beiträge zur europäischen Aufklärung. Bd. 14). Niemeyer, Tübingen 2000, .
 (de) Adolf Laufs: Das Deutsche Rechtswörterbuch. In: Akademie-Journal. Bd. 2, 1993,, S. 7–11.
 (de) Ingrid Lemberg: Die Belegexzerption zu historischen Wörterbüchern am Beispiel des Frühneuhochdeutschen Wörterbuches und des Deutschen Rechtswörterbuches. In: Herbert Ernst Wiegand (Hrsg.): Wörterbücher in der Diskussion II. Vorträge aus dem Heidelberger Lexikographischen Kolloquium (= Lexicographica. Series maior. Bd. 70). Niemeyer, Tübingen 1996, S. 83–102.
 (de) Ingrid Lemberg: Entstehung des Deutschen Rechtswörterbuchs. In: Lexicographica. Internationales Jahrbuch für Lexikographie. Bd. 12, 1996,, S. 105–124.
 (de) Ingrid Lemberg: Hypertextualisierungsformen im Deutschen Rechtswörterbuch. In: Sprache und Datenverarbeitung. International Journal for Language Data Processing. Bd. 22, Heft 1, 1998,, S. 44–54
 (de) Ingrid Lemberg: Lexikographische Erläuterungen im Deutschen Rechtswörterbuch: Gestaltungsmuster in einem Wörterbuch der älteren deutschen Rechtssprache. In: Herbert Ernst Wiegand (Hrsg.): Wörterbücher in der Diskussion III. Vorträge aus dem Heidelberger Lexikographischen Kolloquium (= Lexicographica. Series maior. Bd. 84). Niemeyer, Tübingen 1998, S. 135–154.
 (de) Ingrid Lemberg, Sybille Petzold, Heino Speer: Der Weg des Deutschen Rechtswörterbuchs in das Internet. In: Herbert Ernst Wiegand (Hrsg.): Wörterbücher in der Diskussion III. Vorträge aus dem Heidelberger Lexikographischen Kolloquium (= Lexicographica. Series maior. Bd. 84). Niemeyer, Tübingen 1998, S. 262–284.
 (de) Ingrid Lemberg, Heino Speer: Bericht über das Deutsche Rechtswörterbuch. In: Zeitschrift der Savigny-Stiftung für Rechtsgeschichte. Germanistische Abteilung. Bd. 114, 1997, S. 679–697.
 (de) Eva-Maria Lill: Die EDV – das Ende aller Verzettelung? Der Einsatz der elektronischen Datenverarbeitung am Deutschen Rechtswörterbuch. In: Rudolf Grosse (Hrsg.): Bedeutungserfassung und Bedeutungsbeschreibung in historischen und dialektologischen Wörterbüchern. Beiträge zu einer Arbeitstagung der Deutschsprachigen Wörterbücher, Projekte an Akademien und Universitäten vom 7. bis 9. März 1996 anläßlich des 150jährigen Jubiläums der Sächsischen Akademie der Wissenschaften zu Leipzig (= Abhandlungen der Sächsischen Akademie der Wissenschaften zu Leipzig. Philologisch-Historische Klasse. Bd. 75, Heft 1). Hirzel, Stuttgart u. a. 1998, S. 237–248.
 (de) Ulrike Rühl: Das Glossar zum Stadtrecht von Cleve. In: Bernhard Diestelkamp, Klaus Flink (Hrsg.): Der Oberhof Kleve und seine Schöffensprüche. Untersuchungen zum Klever Stadtrecht (= Klever Archiv. Bd. 15). Stadtarchiv Kleve, Kleve 1994, S. 263–313.
 (de) Heino Speer: Das Deutsche Rechtswörterbuch: Historische Lexikographie einer Fachsprache. In: Lexicographica. Internationales Jahrbuch für Lexikographie. Bd. 5, 1989, S. 85–128 (PDF-Datei; 336 kB).
 (de) Heino Speer: Das Deutsche Rechtswörterbuch: Vorstellung des Wörterbuchs und lexikographische Praxis am Beispiel „magdeburgisch“. In: Ulrich Goebel, Oskar Reichmann (Hrsg.): Historical Lexicography of the German Language (= Studies in German Language and Literature. SGLL. Bd. 6 = Studies in Russian and German. Bd. 3). Band 2. Mellen, Lewiston NY u. a. 1991, S. 675–711.
 (de) Heino Speer: DRW to FAUST. Ein Wörterbuch zwischen Tradition und Fortschritt. In: Lexicographica. Internationales Jahrbuch für Lexikographie. Bd. 10, 1994, S. 171–213.
 (de) Heino Speer: Ein Wörterbuch, die elektronische Datenverarbeitung und die Folgen. In: Akademie-Journal. Heft 2, 1998, S. 11–16.
 (de) Heino Speer: Deutsches Rechtswörterbuch. In: Handwörterbuch zur deutschen Rechtsgeschichte. HRG. Band 1: Aachen – Geistliche Bank. 2., völlig überarbeitete und erweiterte Auflage. Schmidt, Berlin 2008, Sp. 1007–1011.

External links 
 http://lawin.org/dictionary-of-historical-german-legal-terms/

German dictionaries
Online dictionaries
Law dictionaries